Events in the year 2022 in Manipur

Incumbents 
 Governor of Manipur - La Ganesan
 Chief Minister of Manipur - Nongthombam Biren Singh
 Government of Manipur - Second N. Biren Singh ministry

Events 
 Ongoing 
 — COVID-19 pandemic
 — Meitei classical language movement
 — Meitei linguistic purism movement
 28 February to 5 March - 2022 Manipur Legislative Assembly election
 28 February to 5 March - 12th Manipur Assembly
 6 May - Inside the Kangla Fort, the "Institute of Bioresources and Sustainable Development" (IBSD), Imphal, planted around 50 fruit bearing plants.
 11 May - Google Translate added Meitei language (under the name "Meiteilon (Manipuri)") during its addition of 24 new languages to the translation tool. The writing system used for Meitei language in this tool is Meitei script.
 15 June - Statue of Meidingu Nara Singh was unveiled in the Kangla Sanathong (Western Kangla Gate) by Nongthombam Biren Singh, the Chief Minister of Manipur.
 19 June - Nongthombam Biren Singh, the Chief Minister of Manipur, flagged off an E-Rickshaw roadshow at the Kangla Sanathong (Kangla Western Gate) in Imphal.
 25 June - "Green Imphal City Campaign" was organised under the theme "Planting towards Greener, Cleaner Imphal" by the Department of Municipal Administration, Housing and Urban Development (MAHUD) in the Kangla Nongpok Torban.
 27 June - At the Kangla Sanathong (Western Kangla Gate, Nongthombam Biren Singh, the Chief Minister of Manipur, flagged off the "Relief Assistance & Disaster Response Team" for the flood-affected people of Assam. Along with the relief materials consisting of 135 quintals of rice, 102 bags of dal, 120 bags of salt, 120 boxes of mustard oil, 40 personnels of State Disaster Response Force (SDRF) were also sent for rescue operations.
 30 June - 2022 Manipur landslide
 5 August - The Manipur State Legislative Assembly re-affirmed a resolution to record the Sanamahi religion (Sanamahism) in the Indian census data with a separate unique code as an officially recognised minority religion of India.
 20 August - 31st anniversary to the Meitei Language Day was observed.
 26 August 2022 to 30 August - Manipur Olympic Games 2022
 18 September - The "Bio Clean Water Care Service OPC Private Limited" installed four bio toilets in the Kangla Nongpok Torban under PPP model, without taking any charges from the government of Manipur. It is the first of its kind in Imphal.
 11 September - Manasha Devi Sapam of Imphal was crowned the Miss Manipur 2022.
 16 September - The Government of Manipur set up a 15-member committee to verify the accuracy of books written about history, culture, tradition, and geography of Manipur, to avoid the distortion of facts, and also mandated the authors of the said subjects to submit their manuscripts (prior to publication) to the Director of Higher Education and University of Manipur, for verification and approval, failing which legal actions of prosecution will be taken up.

Deaths 
 30 June - 2022 Manipur landslide - number of people died is 49 (as per the discovery of dead bodies as of 9 July).

See also 

 History of Manipur

References 

2020s in Manipur
2022 in India